The Municipality of Radenci is a municipality in northern Slovenia. It gets its name from the largest settlement and administrative seat of the municipality, Radenci.

Settlements
In addition to the municipal seat of Radenci, the municipality also includes the following settlements:

 Boračeva
 Hrašenski Vrh
 Hrastje–Mota
 Janžev Vrh
 Kapelski Vrh
 Kobilščak
 Kocjan
 Melanjski Vrh
 Murski Vrh
 Murščak
 Okoslavci
 Paričjak
 Rački Vrh
 Radenski Vrh
 Rihtarovci
 Spodnji Kocjan
 Šratovci
 Turjanci
 Turjanski Vrh
 Zgornji Kocjan
 Žrnova

References

External links

Municipality of Radenci website

Radenci